"Dull Boy" is a single from American heavy metal band Mudvayne's 2007 album By the People, For the People, later included on the band's 2008 studio album The New Game.

Lyrical themes
At the beginning of the song, Chad Gray repeats "All work and no play makes me a dull boy" four times, elevating his voice from a whisper to a scream with each repetition. This is a reference to The Shining. The band has stated in numerous interviews that Stanley Kubrick is Mudvayne's favorite director.

Video
For the video the band made a green screen contest in which they record themselves in a green screen and upload it to their website so that anyone can do their own version of the video and upload it.

Track listing
CD single

Digital single

Charts

References

External links
 Official Music Video at YouTube

Mudvayne songs
2007 singles
Songs written by Chad Gray
Songs written by Ryan Martinie
Songs written by Matthew McDonough
Songs written by Greg Tribbett
2007 songs
Epic Records singles